Amblyseius hurlbutti is a species of mite in the family Phytoseiidae.

References

hurlbutti
Articles created by Qbugbot
Animals described in 1989